The Gazette officielle du Québec is an official publication of the Quebec government. It is used to promulgate new laws and regulations, which thereby become official. It was founded on January 16, 1869.

An earlier Gazette de Québec was an unofficial publication created in 1764, and was replaced by Gazette officielle du Québec in 1823. Archived versions of the Gazette from 1869 to 1995 are available. An annual subscription to the Gazette costs $1185 ($500 and $685, for part 1 and 2, respectively) per year, for both parts. One copy costs $10.71.

See also
 Canada Gazette

References

External links
 http://www3.publicationsduquebec.gouv.qc.ca/gazetteofficielle.fr.html
 http://bibnum2.banq.qc.ca/bna/goq/ Archives 1869–1995

Government of Quebec
Quebec
Legal research
Quebec provincial legislation
Legal literature
Publications established in 1869
1869 establishments in Quebec